Đorđe Višacki (also transliterated Djordje; born  in Belgrade, SR Serbia, Yugoslavia) is a rower from Serbia.

He won two medals at the World Rowing Championships.

He participated at the 2000 Summer Olympics in Sydney and finished 5th in men's coxless pair.

Višacki is Secretary General of the Olympic Committee of Serbia.

External links
 

 

1975 births
Living people
Serbian male rowers
Rowers at the 2000 Summer Olympics
Olympic rowers of Yugoslavia
World Rowing Championships medalists for Serbia